Letters of fire and sword were a Scottish legal instrument.  If a criminal resisted the law and refused to answer his citation, it was considered treason in the Scottish courts; and “letters of fire and sword” were sent to the sheriff, authorising him to use either or both these instruments to apprehend the contumacious party.

References

External links

Warrants